Las Tunas is a former settlement in Los Angeles County, California. It lay an elevation of 3 feet (1 m). It was located near Topanga, California.

References

Former settlements in Los Angeles County, California
Topanga, California
Populated places in the Santa Monica Mountains
Former populated places in California